This is an index of conservation topics. It is an alphabetical index of articles relating to conservation biology and conservation of the natural environment.

A
 Abiotic stress - Adaptive management - Adventive plant - Aerial-seeding - Agreed Measures for the Conservation of Antarctic Fauna and Flora - Agroecology - American Prairie Foundation - Anti-whaling - Assisted migration - Assisted migration of forests in North America

B
 Biodegradation - Biodiversity - Biodiversity action plan - Biodiversity hotspot - Biogenic - Biodiversity Outcomes Framework - Biogeographic realm - Biogeography - Bioinformatics - Biological integrity - Biomagnification - Biomaterial - Biome - Biomimicry - Biomonitoring - Biophilia hypothesis - Biophilic design - Biopiracy - Bioregion - Bioregionalism - Biosafety - Biosalinity - Biosecurity - Biosphere - Biosphere reserve - Biostatistics - Biosurvey - Biotechnology - Bioterrorism - Biotransference - Bird conservation - Blue-listed - Bottom trawling - Buffer zone

C
 Captive breeding - Cave conservation - Charismatic megafauna - CITES - Common species - Community-based conservation - Compassionate conservation - Conference of Governors - Conservation agriculture - Conservation area - Conservation authority - Conservation biology - Conservation Commons - Conservation community - Conservation dependent - Conservation designation - Conservation development - Conservation easement - Conservation ethic - Conservation grazing - Conservation headland - Conservation land trust – Conservation management system - Conservation movement - Conservation of American bison  - Conservation park - Conservation photography - Conservation psychology - Conservation-reliant species - Conservation status - Conservation welfare - Convention on Biological Diversity - COTES - Critically endangered species - Cross-boundary subsidy - Cross-fostering (conservation of resources)

D
 Data deficient - Debt-for-nature swap - Deforestation

E
 Ecoregion - Ecosystem restoration - Ecosystem services - Ecological crisis - Ecological island - Ecological niche - Ecological selection - Ecotone - Edge effect - Endangered species - Endangered species recovery plan - Endemic Bird Area - Endemism - Environmental stewardship - Evolutionarily Significant Unit - Extinction - Extinction event - Ex-situ conservation - Extinct in the wild - Extinction threshold

F
 Flagship species - Forest fragmentation - Fortress conservation

G
 Gaia theory - Gaia philosophy - Gaian -  Game Warden - GPS Wildlife Tracking - GRANK - Gap analysis - Genetic pollution - Genetic erosion - Global strategy for plant conservation - Greenprinting

H
 Habitat - Habitat fragmentation - Habitat conservation - Habitat destruction - Habitat fragmentation - Habitats Directive

I
 Illegal logging - Important Bird Area - In-situ conservation - Index of biological integrity - Indianapolis Prize - Indigenous and community conserved area - The Institute for Bird Populations - Integrated Conservation and Development Project - Invader potential - Island restoration

K
 Keystone species

L
 Landscape-scale conservation - Lists of ecoregions by country - List of extinct birds - List of solar energy topics - List of threatened species of the Philippines - Local nature reserve - Logging - Latent extinction risk - Lower risk

M
 Marine Protected Area - Marine conservation - Marine park - Marine reserve - Marxan - Millennium Seed Bank Partnership - Minimal impact code - Mission blue butterfly habitat conservation - Monarch butterfly conservation in California

N
 National Cleanup Day -   National Conservation Commission - National Conservation Exposition - National marine conservation area - National nature reserve - National park - NATURA 2000 - Natural heritage - Natural monument – Nature reserve - Nest box - North American Game Warden Museum

O
 Old growth forest - Operation Wallacea

P
 Penguin sweater - Pollinator decline - Protected area

R
 Ramsar site - Rare species - Red-listed - Regional Forest Agreement - Regional Red List - Reforestation - Reintroduction - Resource management - Restoration ecology - Rewilding - Roadless area conservation

S
 Scaling pattern of occupancy - Seedbank - Site based conservation - Site of Nature Conservation Interest - Site of Special Scientific Interest - Small population size - Soil salination - Soils retrogression and degradation - Solar air conditioning - Solar energy - Solar thermal energy - Shifting baseline syndrome - Soil conservation - Source-sink dynamics - Special Area of Conservation - Special Protection Area - Species richness - Species Survival Plan - Species of concern - Species translocation - Stewardship cessation Strict nature reserve - Subnational rank - Sustainability - Sustainable forest management - Sustainable habitat - Sustainable industries - Sustainable procurement - Sustainable seafood - Sustainable yield

T
 Terraforming - Terrestrial ecoregion - The Nature Conservancy - 30 by 30 - Threatened species - Trail ethics - Translocation

U
 Urban biosphere reserve

V
 Variable retention - Vulnerability and susceptibility in conservation biology - Vulnerable species

W
 Water Conservation Order - Waterbar - Waterway restoration - Weed - Wetland conservation - Wilderness area - Wildlife corridor - Wildlife Conservation Society - Wildlife reserve - Wildlife trade - Woodland management - World Cleanup Day - World Commission on Protected Areas - World Conference on Breeding Endangered Species in Captivity as an Aid to their Survival - World Heritage Site - World Network of Biosphere Reserves

Z
 Zoo - Zoogeography

Conventions, protocols, panels and summits
 Biosafety protocol - Montreal 2000
 Convention on Biological Diversity
 Convention on the Conservation of Migratory Species of Wild Animals
 Convention on Fishing and Conservation of Living Resources of the High Seas
 Convention on International Trade in Endangered Species of Wild Fauna and Flora (CITES)
 Convention on the Protection and Use of Transboundary Watercourses and International Lakes
 Convention on Wetlands of International Importance Especially As Waterfowl Habitat - Ramsar Convention 
 Earth Summit 2002 (World Summit on Sustainable Development), Johannesburg 2002
 Intergovernmental Panel on Climate Change
 International Convention for the Regulation of Whaling
 International Seabed Authority
 International Treaty on Plant Genetic Resources for Food and Agriculture
 International Tropical Timber Agreement, 1983
 IUCN protected area categories
 IUCN Red List
 United Nations Convention on the Law of the Sea
 World Commission on Protected Areas - WCPA

United Nations bodies
 UNEP World Conservation Monitoring Centre (WCMC)
 United Nations Educational, Scientific and Cultural Organization
 United Nations Environment Programme (UNEP)
 United Nations Framework Convention on Climate Change

See also

 Index of environmental articles
 List of endangered species
 List of environmental issues
 List of invasive species
 Environmental agreements
 Environmentalism

Environmental conservation
Conservation Articles
Conservation Articles